The Chrysler C-200 was a concept car released in 1952 by Chrysler.

Beginnings
The C-200 was designed by Virgil Exner. He and his small team designed the car at Chrysler Corporation in Detroit, Michigan. It was built by Carrozzeria Ghia, a company in Turin, Italy.  The base price was $20,000. The car had the power of an American Chrysler V8 in an Italian sports car style body. The interior was upholstered in black leather and the exterior paint schem was a two-toned pale green and black. The 'gun-sight' taillight design was featured on later Chrysler production models.

References

 "1952 Chrysler C-200 concept car". allpar.com.
 "Chrysler C-200". Diseno-art.com.

C-200
Cars introduced in 1952